Life Storage, Inc. is a real estate investment trust headquartered in Williamsville, New York, that invests in self-storage units. The company was previously known as Sovran Self Storage and Uncle Bob's Self Storage. As of February 2023, the company had over 1,100 facilities in 37 states. It is the 4th largest owner of self-storage units in the United States and the 4th largest self-storage property manager.

In addition to its standard rental storage units, the company also offers units with climate control and dehumidification systems. There are also larger units for items like boats, cars, and other large properties. Most facilities offer a variety of amenities and features, including keypad security systems that restrict floor access to approved users or property access to customers only, security systems that monitor activity on the facility grounds, free truck use, and moving and storage merchandise. Some facilities also offer individual door alarms, intercom systems, and conference rooms for business meetings.

History
The origins of Life Storage, formerly known as Sovran Self Storage, can be traced back to 1982, when it was founded as a financial planning firm in Buffalo, New York. Three years later, in 1985, the company entered the self-storage industry by opening its first facility in Florida, eventually accumulating around 30 such facilities along the East Coast over the next three years. 

Throughout the next decade, the company continued to expand, accumulating 62 self-storage facilities across the United States, and rebranding each one to "Uncle Bob's Self Storage" under the leadership of former CEO and Executive Chairman, Robert J. Attea. In 1995, the company became a public company through an initial public offering. By the end of 1996, the company operated 111 self-storage facilities in 15 states along the East Coast and Texas, eventually growing to 222 facilities by 1999, all of which used "Uncle Bob's" name. Five years later, the company operated facilities in 21 states.

In 2012, David Rogers, the former CFO, was appointed CEO, replacing Robert J. Attea, who remained Executive Chairman. As of November 2013, the company operated 471 facilities in 25 states. In the following years, the company continued to expand through acquisitions and rebranding efforts. The company was added to the S&P 400 stock market index in 2015. In 2016, the company acquired Life Storage LP for $1.3 billion, giving it its first properties in Northern California and Las Vegas. Following this acquisition, the company rebranded its facilities from "Uncle Bob's Self Storage" to "Life Storage" and changed its name.

Throughout the following years, the company continued to grow and make strategic acquisitions, including properties in Wisconsin, Arizona, Nevada, and Tennessee. In 2019, Joseph Saffire replaced David Rogers as the company's CEO. In the same year, the company acquired a property in Tampa and sold properties in Greensboro, North Carolina.

In February 2023, Public Storage announced a proposed acquisition offer of $11 billion for Life Storage. The move represents a ramped-up effort by Public Storage to acquire its smaller competitor, following the rejection of an earlier bid.

References

External links

1982 establishments in New York (state)
1995 initial public offerings
Companies based in Erie County, New York
Companies listed on the New York Stock Exchange
Real estate companies established in 1982
Real estate investment trusts of the United States
Storage companies